Edgar Arnold "Rusty" Patenaude (October 17, 1949 – July 24, 2021) was a professional ice hockey player who played 431 games in the World Hockey Association.  He played with the Edmonton Oilers and Indianapolis Racers.

References

External links

1949 births
2021 deaths
Amarillo Wranglers players
Baltimore Clippers players
Canadian ice hockey right wingers
Edmonton Oilers (WHA) players
Fort Wayne Komets players
Ice hockey people from British Columbia
Indianapolis Racers players
People from the Cariboo Regional District
Pittsburgh Penguins draft picks